Mount Airy Historic District can refer to:
 Mount Airy Historic District (Mount Airy, Maryland), listed on the NRHP in Maryland
 Mount Airy Historic District (Mount Airy, North Carolina), listed on the NRHP in North Carolina
 Mount Airy Historic District (Lambertville, New Jersey), listed on the NRHP in New Jersey
 Mount Airy Historic District (Bethlehem, Pennsylvania), listed on the NRHP in Pennsylvania

See also
Mount Airy (disambiguation)